Liam Boyle is a British actor.

Life and career 
Boyle grew up in Heywood, Greater Manchester, England. It was in his final preparations for a teaching degree at University that Boyle was spotted by a casting director at an open audition for a film. Instead of going to the final interviews for his degree he made the decision to go to the recalls for the film, which fell on the same day. He was trained in drama at the Oldham Theatre Workshop. Whilst at college Boyle was auditioned by the casting agent David Shaw for a film called Love + Hate, getting a small role in the film as Steve.

He has since appeared in various TV and film roles, including the awarding series The Street, Instinct and Land Girls. His most well known performance was as Elvis in the movie Awaydays. In December 2021, he joined the cast of Emmerdale as Alex Moore.

Filmography

References

External links

Living people
English male actors
English people of Irish descent
Actors from Bolton
Actors from Rochdale
Male actors from Lancashire
People from Heywood, Greater Manchester
Year of birth missing (living people)